The Campeonato Nacional de Liga de Primera División, commonly known simply as Primera División in Spain, and as La Liga in English-speaking countries and officially as LaLiga Santander for sponsorship reasons, stylized as LaLiga, is the men's top professional football division of the Spanish football league system. Administered by the Liga Nacional de Fútbol Profesional, it is contested by 20 teams, with the three lowest-placed teams at the end of each season being relegated to the Segunda División and replaced by the top two teams and a play-off winner in that division.

Since its inception, a total of 62 teams have competed in La Liga. Nine teams have been crowned champions, with Barcelona winning the inaugural La Liga and Real Madrid winning the title a record 35 times, most recently in the 2021–22 season. During the 1940s Valencia, Atlético Madrid and Barcelona emerged as the strongest clubs, winning several titles. Real Madrid and Barcelona dominated the championship in the 1950s, each winning four La Liga titles during the decade. During the 1960s and 1970s, Real Madrid dominated La Liga, winning fourteen titles, with Atlético Madrid winning four. During the 1980s and 1990s Real Madrid were prominent in La Liga, but the Basque clubs of Athletic Club and Real Sociedad had their share of success, each winning two Liga titles. From the 1990s onward, Barcelona have dominated La Liga, winning sixteen titles to date. Although Real Madrid has been prominent, winning ten titles, La Liga has also seen other champions, including Atlético Madrid, Valencia, and Deportivo La Coruña.

According to UEFA's league coefficient rankings, La Liga has been the top league in Europe in each of the seven years from 2013 to 2019 (calculated using accumulated figures from five preceding seasons) and has led Europe for 22 of the 60 ranked years up to 2019, more than any other country. It has also produced the continent's top-rated club more times (22) than any other league in that period, more than double that of second-placed Serie A (Italy), including the top club in 10 of the 11 seasons between 2009 and 2019; each of these pinnacles was achieved by either Barcelona or Real Madrid. La Liga clubs have won the most UEFA Champions League (19), UEFA Europa League (13), UEFA Super Cup (16) and FIFA Club World Cup (7) titles, and its players have accumulated the highest number of Ballon d'Or awards (24), The Best FIFA Men's Player awards (19) and UEFA Men's Player of the Year awards (12).

La Liga is one of the most popular professional sports leagues globally, with an average attendance of 26,933 for league matches in the 2018–19 season. This is the eighth-highest of any domestic professional sports league in the world and the third-highest of any professional association football league in the world, behind the Bundesliga and the Premier League, and above the other two so-called "Big Five" European leagues, Serie A and Ligue 1. La Liga is also the seventh wealthiest professional sports league in the world by revenue, after the NFL, MLB, the NBA, the Premier League, the NHL, and the Bundesliga.

Competition format
The competition format follows the usual double round-robin format. During the course of a season, which lasts from August to May, each club plays every other club twice, once at home and once away, for 38 matches. Teams receive three points for a win, one point for a draw, and no points for a loss. Teams are ranked by total points, with the highest-ranked club crowned champion at the end of the season.

Promotion and relegation
A system of promotion and relegation exists between the Primera División and the Segunda División. The three lowest placed teams in La Liga are relegated to the Segunda División, and the top two teams from the Segunda División promoted to La Liga, with an additional club promoted after a series of play-offs involving the third, fourth, fifth and sixth placed clubs. Below is a complete record of how many teams played in each season throughout the league's history;

Tie breaker rules
If points are equal between two or more clubs, the rules are:
 If all clubs involved have played each other twice:
 If the tie is between two clubs, then the tie is broken using the head-to-head goal difference for those clubs (without away goals rule).
 If the tie is between more than two clubs, then the tie is broken using the games the clubs have played against each other:
 a) head-to-head points
 b) head-to-head goal difference
 If two legged games between all clubs involved have not been played, or the tie is not broken by the rules above, it is broken using:
 a) total goal difference
 b) total goals scored
 If the tie is still not broken, the winner will be determined by Fair Play scales. These are:
 yellow card, 1 point
 doubled yellow card/ejection, 2 points
 direct red card, 3 points
 suspension or disqualification of coach, executive or other club personnel (outside referees' decisions), 5 points
 misconduct of the supporters: mild 5 points, serious 6 points, very serious 7 points
 stadium closure, 10 points
 if the Competition Committee removes a penalty, the points are also removed
 If the tie is still not broken, it will be resolved with a tie-break match in a neutral stadium.

Qualification for European competitions

Current criteria

The top four teams in La Liga qualify for the subsequent season's UEFA Champions League group stage. The winners of the UEFA Champions League and UEFA Europa League also qualify for the subsequent season's UEFA Champions League group stage. If this means 6 La Liga teams qualify, then the 4th place team in La Liga instead plays in the UEFA Europa League, as any single nation is limited to a maximum of 5 teams.

The 5th place team in La Liga qualifies for the subsequent season's UEFA Europa League group stage. The winner of the Copa del Rey also qualifies for the subsequent season's UEFA Europa League group stage, but if the winner also finished in the top 5 places in La Liga, then this place reverts to the team that finished 6th in La Liga. Furthermore, the 6th place (or 7th if 6th already qualifies due to the Copa del Rey) team qualifies for the subsequent season's UEFA Conference League play-off round.

The number of places allocated to Spanish clubs in UEFA competitions is dependent upon the position a country holds in the UEFA country coefficients, which are calculated based upon the performance of teams in UEFA competitions in the previous five years. As of the end of season 2020–21, the ranking of Spain (and de facto La Liga) is second.

History

Foundation
In April 1928, José María Acha, a director at Getxo, first proposed the idea of a national league in Spain. After much debate about the size of the league and who would take part, the Real Federación Española de Fútbol eventually agreed on the ten teams who would form the first Primera División in 1929. Barcelona, Real Madrid, Athletic Club, Real Sociedad, Getxo, and Real Unión were all selected as previous winners of the Copa del Rey. Atlético Madrid, Espanyol, and Europa qualified as Copa del Rey runners-up and Racing de Santander qualified through a knockout competition. Only three of the founding clubs (Real Madrid, Barcelona, and Athletic Club) have never been relegated from the Primera División.

1930s: Athletic Club prominence
Although Barcelona won the very first Liga in 1929 and Real Madrid won their first titles in 1932 and 1933, it was Athletic Club that set the early pace winning Primera División in 1930, 1931, 1934 and 1936. They were also runners-up in 1932 and 1933. In 1935, Real Betis, then known as Betis Balompié, won their only title to date. Primera División was suspended during the Spanish Civil War.

In 1937, the teams in the Republican area of Spain, with the notable exception of the two Madrid clubs, competed in the Mediterranean League and Barcelona emerged as champions. Seventy years later, on 28 September 2007, Barcelona requested the Royal Spanish Football Federation (Spanish acronym RFEF) to recognise that title as a Liga title. This action was taken after RFEF was asked to recognise Levante FC's Copa de la España Libre win as equivalent to Copa del Rey trophy. Nevertheless, the governing body of Spanish football has not made an outright decision yet.

1940s: Atlético Madrid, Barcelona and Valencia emerge

When the Primera División resumed after the Spanish Civil War, it was Atlético Aviación (nowadays Atlético Madrid), Valencia, and FC Barcelona that emerged as the strongest clubs. Atlético were only awarded a place during the 1939–40 season as a replacement for Real Oviedo, whose ground had been damaged during the war. The club subsequently won its first Liga title and retained it in 1941. While other clubs lost players to exile, execution, and as casualties of the war, the Atlético team was reinforced by a merger. The young, pre-war squad of Valencia had also remained intact and in the post-war years matured into champions, gaining three Liga titles in 1942, 1944, and 1947. They were also runners-up in 1948 and 1949. Sevilla also enjoyed a brief golden era, finishing as runners-up in 1940 and 1942 before winning their only title to date in 1946.

Meanwhile, on the other side of Spain, FC Barcelona began to emerge as a force under the legendary Josep Samitier. A Spanish footballer for both Barcelona and Real Madrid, Samitier cemented his legacy with Barcelona. During his playing career with Barcelona he scored 133 goals, won the inaugural La Liga title and five Copa Del Rey. In 1944, Samitier returned to Barcelona as a coach and guided them in winning their second La Liga title in 1945. Under Samitier and legendary players César Rodríguez, Josep Escolà, Estanislau Basora and Mariano Gonzalvo, Barcelona dominated La Liga in the late 1940s, winning back to back La Liga titles in 1948 and 1949. The 1940s proved to be a successful season for Barcelona, winning three La Liga titles and one Copa Del Rey, but the 1950s proved to be a decade of dominance, not just from Barcelona, but from Real Madrid.

1950s: FC Barcelona continue their success but Real Madrid emerges

Although Atlético Madrid, previously known as Atlético Aviación, were champions in 1950 and 1951 under catenaccio mastermind Helenio Herrera the 1950s continued the success FC Barcelona had during the late 1940s after they had won back to back La Liga titles. During this decade, Barcelona's first golden era emerged. Under coach Ferdinand Daučík, FC Barcelona won back-to-back doubles, winning La Liga and Copa Del Rey in 1952 and 1953. In 1952, FC Barcelona made history yet again by winning five distinctive trophies in one year. This team, composed of László Kubala, Mariano Gonzalvo, César Rodríguez and Joan Segarra won La Liga, Copa Del Rey, Copa Eva Duarte (predecessor of Spanish Super Cup), Latin Cup and Copa Martini & Rossi. Their success in winning five trophies in one year earned them the name 'L’equip de les cinc Copes' or The Team of The Five Cups. In the latter parts of the 1950s, coached by Helenio Herrera and featuring Luis Suárez, Barcelona won yet again their third set of back-to-back La Liga, winning them in 1959 and 1960. In 1959, FC Barcelona also won another double of La Liga / Copa Del Rey, conquering three doubles in the 1950s.

The 1950s also saw the beginning of the Real Madrid dominance. During the 1930s through the 1950s there were strict limits imposed on foreign players. In most cases, clubs could have only three foreign players in their squads, meaning that at least eight local players had to play in every game. During the 1950s, however, these rules were circumvented by Real Madrid who naturalized Alfredo Di Stéfano and Ferenc Puskás. Di Stéfano, Puskás, Raymond Kopa and Francisco Gento formed the nucleus of the Real Madrid team that dominated the second half of the 1950s. Real Madrid won their third La Liga in 1954 — their first since 1933 — and retained their title in 1955. In 1956, Athletic Club won their sixth La Liga title, but Real Madrid won La Liga again in 1957 and 1958. The 1950s also saw Real Madrid dominate the newly created European Cup, sweeping the first five editions.

All in all, Barcelona and Real Madrid won 4 La Liga titles each in the 50s, with Atlético Madrid winning two Liga and Athletic Club winning one during this decade.

1960s–1970s: Real Madrid superiority
Real Madrid dominated La Liga between 1960 and 1980, being crowned champions 14 times. Real Madrid won five La Liga titles in a row from 1961 to 1965 as well as winning three doubles between 1960 and 1980. During the 1960s and 1970s, only Atlético Madrid offered Real Madrid any serious challenge. Atlético Madrid were crowned La Liga champions four times in 1966, 1970, 1973, and 1977. Atlético Madrid also finished second place in 1961, 1963, and 1965. In 1971, Valencia won their fourth La Liga title in 1971 under Alfredo Di Stéfano, and the Johan Cruyff-inspired Barcelona won their ninth La Liga in 1974.

1980s: Real Madrid dominance but the Basque Clubs disrupt their monopoly
Real Madrid's monopoly in La Liga was interrupted significantly in the 1980s. Although Real Madrid won another five La Liga titles in a row from 1986 to 1990 under the brilliance of Emilio Butragueño and Hugo Sánchez, the Basque clubs of Real Sociedad and Athletic Club also dominated the 1980s. Real Sociedad won back-to-back La Liga titles in 1981 and 1982, after leaving Real Madrid runner-up both times. Their title wins were followed by fellow Basque club Athletic Club, who won back-to-back titles in 1983 and 1984, with Athletic Club winning their fifth La Liga and Copa Del Rey double in 1984. Barcelona won their tenth La Liga title in 1985 under coach Terry Venables, their first La Liga win since 1974.

1990s: Barcelona's Dream Team

Johan Cruyff returned to Barcelona as manager in 1988, and assembled the legendary Dream Team. When Cruyff took hold of this Barcelona side they had won only two La Liga titles in the past 20 years. Cruyff decided to build a team composed of international stars and La Masia graduates in order to restore Barcelona to their former glorious days. This team was formed by international stars Romario, Michael Laudrup, Hristo Stoichkov and Ronald Koeman. Cruyff's Dream Team also consisted of La Masia graduates Pep Guardiola, Albert Ferrer, and Guillermo Amor, as well as Spaniard Andoni Zubizarreta.

Johan Cruyff changed the way modern football was played, and incorporated the principles of ‘Total Football’ into this team. The success of possession-based football was revolutionary, and Cruyff's team won their first European Cup in 1992 and four consecutive La Liga titles between 1991 and 1994. In total, Cruyff won 11 trophies in eight years, making him the most successful manager in Barcelona's history until the record was broken by his protégé Pep Guardiola two decades later.

Barcelona's run ended with Real Madrid winning La Liga in 1995. Atlético Madrid won their ninth La Liga title in 1996, as well as their only Liga/Copa Del Rey double, before Real Madrid added another league title to their cabinet in 1997. After the success of Cruyff, another Dutchman – Ajax manager, Louis van Gaal – arrived at the Camp Nou, and with the talents of Luís Figo, Luis Enrique, and Rivaldo, Barcelona won the La Liga title in 1998 and 1999, including their fourth double of Liga and Copa Del Rey in 1998. All in all, Barcelona won six La Liga titles in the 1990s.

2000s: Real Madrid, Barcelona and Valencia's re-emergence

The 21st century continued the success FC Barcelona had in the 1990s under Johan Cruyff dominating La Liga. Although Real Madrid had been prominent, Barcelona created a hegemony in Spain not seen since the Real Madrid of the 1960s–70s. Since the start of the new century, Barcelona won 10 La Ligas, including two trebles and four doubles. This new century however has also seen new challengers being crowned champions. Between 1999–2000 and 2004, Deportivo La Coruña finished in the top three on five occasions, a better record than either Real Madrid or Barcelona, and in 2000, under Javier Irureta, Deportivo became the ninth team to be crowned champions. Valencia were one of the strongest teams in Europe in the early to mid 2000s; they were crowned La Liga champions in 2002 and 2004 under Rafael Benítez, whilst also being runners-up in the UEFA Champions League in 2000 and 2001 under Hector Cuper and winning the UEFA Cup in 2004 and the Copa del Rey in 1999.

Real Madrid won their first Liga titles of the century in 2001 and 2003. With world-class players like Raúl, Ruud van Nistelrooy and Gonzalo Higuaín, Real Madrid won back-to-back La Liga titles in 2006–07 and 2007–08. FC Barcelona won their first title of the new century after Real Madrid and Valencia had shared the last four titles under the brilliance of Ronaldinho and Samuel Eto'o in the 2004–05 season. Barcelona retained the title to make it back-to-back wins in the 2005–06 season.

2010s: Barcelona, Real Madrid and Atletico
In 2009–10, Real Madrid achieved a record 96 points but still finished behind Barcelona, who amassed 99 points. Barcelona then won a third straight La Liga title in the 2010–11 season with 96 points to Real's 92, but Real Madrid ended their winning streak in the 2011–12 season under the management of José Mourinho and with the likes of Cristiano Ronaldo, Ángel Di María, Mesut Özil and Karim Benzema. Madrid won their 32nd La Liga title with a record 100 points, a record 121 goals scored and a record +89 goal difference. The following year, in the 2012–13 season, Barcelona won yet another La Liga title under coach Tito Vilanova, replicating the 100 points record Real Madrid achieved the previous year. Atlético Madrid, under the management of Diego Simeone, won their tenth La Liga title in 2013–14, their first since 1996. They became the first team since Valencia in 2004 to win La Liga and break Barcelona and Real Madrid's dominion over the league. In the 2014–15 season, under the trio of Messi, Neymar, and Suarez nicknamed 'MSN', Barcelona made history by becoming the first team to achieve a second Treble, and winning a sixth Liga/Copa Del Rey double. Barcelona continued their dominance, and in the 2015–16 season they won a back-to-back Liga/Copa Del Rey double, something that had not been achieved since the 1950s. Real Madrid brought back the La Liga title under the management of Zinedine Zidane in 2016–17, but Barcelona won the title again in the 2017–18 season, as well as winning their eighth double, for 7 La Liga titles in 10 years. Barcelona retained the title yet again and won their 26th La Liga title in the 2018–19 season, for 8 La Liga titles in 11 years. Real Madrid reclaimed the title in 2019–20, winning the season that was severely disrupted by the COVID-19 pandemic.

2020s: present
The 2020–21 season started on 12 September. The teams participating in La Liga 2020–21 are Athletic Club de Bilbao, Atlético de Madrid, Barcelona, Betis, Cádiz, Eibar, Getafe, Huesca, Levante, Osasuna, Real Madrid, Real Sociedad, Sevilla, Valencia, Valladolid, Villarreal, Elche, Alavés, Eibar and Celta Vigo. The teams joining the Primera División, coming from Segunda are Cadiz, Elche and Huesca. Atletico Madrid won the 2020–21 season with Real Madrid as runners-up.

In August 2021, La Liga clubs approved a €2.7 billion deal to sell 10% of the league to CVC Capital Partners.

The 2021–22 season was won by Real Madrid with four games to spare. Barcelona ended up second after improving in the second half of the season.

Clubs
20 teams contest the league in its current season, including the top 17 sides from the 2021–22 season and three promoted from the 2021–22 Segunda División. Almería and Real Valladolid were promoted directly, and Girona won the promotion play-off.

La Liga clubs in Europe

The Primera División is currently second in the UEFA rankings of European leagues based on their performances in European competitions over a five-year period, behind England's Premier League, but ahead of Italy's Serie A and Germany's Bundesliga.

Real Madrid, Barcelona, and Atlético Madrid have been in the top ten most successful clubs in European football in terms of total European trophies. These three clubs, along with Sevilla and Valencia, are the only Spanish clubs to have won five or more international trophies. Deportivo La Coruña are the joint fifth-most participating Spanish team in the Champions League with Sevilla — after Real Madrid, Barcelona, Valencia and Atlético Madrid — with five Champions League appearances in a row, including a semi-finals appearance in 2003–04.

During the 2005–06 European season, La Liga became the first league to have its clubs win both the Champions League and UEFA Cup since 1997, as Barcelona won the UEFA Champions League and Sevilla won the UEFA Cup. This feat was repeated four times in five seasons: during the 2013–14 season Real Madrid won their tenth Champions League title and Sevilla won their third Europa League, during the 2014–15 season Barcelona won their fifth Champions League title and Sevilla won their fourth Europa League, during the 2015–16 season Real Madrid won their eleventh Champions League title and Sevilla won their fifth Europa League (becoming the first team to win the title three times in a row), and during the 2017–18 season Real Madrid won their thirteenth Champions League title and Atlético Madrid won their third Europa League.

In 2015, La Liga became the first league to enter five teams in the Champions League group stage, with Barcelona, Real Madrid, Atlético Madrid and Valencia qualifying via their league position and Sevilla qualifying by virtue of their victory in the Europa League, courtesy of a rule change.

Champions

Performance by club

Players

Eligibility of non-EU players
In La Liga in 2020, each club is allowed five non-EU players but are only allowed to name three non-EU players in each matchday squad.

Players can claim citizenship from the nation their ancestors came from. If a player does not have European ancestry, he can claim Spanish citizenship after playing in Spain for five years. Sometimes, this can lead to a triple-citizenship situation; for example, Leo Franco, who was born in Argentina, is of Italian heritage yet can claim a Spanish passport, having played in La Liga for over five years.

In addition, players from the ACP countries—countries in Africa, the Caribbean, and the Pacific that are signatories to the Cotonou Agreement—are not counted against non-EU quotas due to the Kolpak ruling.

Individual awards
Until the 2008–09 season, no official individual awards existed in La Liga. In the 2008–09 season, the governing body created the LFP Awards (now called La Liga Awards), awarded each season to individual players and coaches. The majority of these awards were discontinued after the 2015–16 season. Additional awards relating to La Liga are distributed, some not sanctioned by the Liga de Futbol Profesional or RFEF and therefore not regarded as official. The most notable of these are four awarded by Spain's largest sports paper, Marca, namely the Pichichi Trophy, awarded to the top scorer of the season; the Ricardo Zamora Trophy, for the goalkeeper with the fewest goals allowed per game (minimum 28 games); the Alfredo Di Stéfano Trophy, for the player judged to be the best overall player in the division; and the Zarra Trophy, for the top scorer among Spanish domestic players.

Since the 2013–14 season, La Liga has also bestowed the monthly manager of the month and player of the month awards.

Transfers
The first La Liga player to be involved in a transfer which broke the world record was Luis Suárez in 1961, who moved from Barcelona to Inter Milan for £152,000 (£ million in ). 12 years later, Johan Cruyff was the first player to join a club in La Liga for a record fee of £922,000 (£ million in ), when he moved from Ajax to Barcelona. In 1982, Barcelona again set the record by signing Diego Maradona from Boca Juniors for £5 million (£ million in ). Real Betis set the world record in 1998 when they signed Denílson from São Paulo for £21.5 million (£ million in ).

Four of the last six world transfer records have been set by Real Madrid, signing Luís Figo, Zinedine Zidane, Cristiano Ronaldo (plus a deal for Kaká days before Ronaldo which fell just below a world record due to the way the fee was calculated) and finally Gareth Bale, who was bought in 2013 for £85.3m (€103.4m or $140m at the time; £m in ) from Tottenham Hotspur.

Brazilian forward Neymar was the subject of an expensive and complicated transfer arrangement when he joined Barcelona from Santos in 2013, and his outgoing transfer to Paris Saint-Germain in 2017 set a new world record fee at €222m via his buyout clause. Barcelona soon invested a large amount of the money received from this transfer in a replacement, Ousmane Dembélé, whose deal – €105m – was the second most expensive ever before Philippe Coutinho's transfer to Barcelona for €142m in January 2018.

Player records

Most goals

Boldface indicates a player still active in La Liga. Italics indicates a player still active outside La Liga.

Most appearances

Sponsors

 Banco Santander
 Puma
 EA Sports
 Microsoft
 Mahou-San Miguel Group
 Sorare
 Balkrishna Industries
 LaLiga Golazos
 TVM
 Socios.com
 Panini Group
 Legends The Home of Football

Sponsorship names
 Liga BBVA (2008–2016)
 LaLiga Santander (2016–2023)
 LaLiga EA Sports (2023–)

See also

 Football in Spain – overview of football sport 
 Sport in Spain
 Football records and statistics in Spain
 List of attendance at sports leagues
 List of football clubs in Spain
 List of foreign La Liga players
 List of La Liga broadcasters
 List of La Liga stadiums
 List of Spanish football champions
 Primera División (women)
 Sports broadcasting contracts in Spain

Explanatory notes

References

External links

  

 
1
1928 establishments in Spain
1929 establishments in Spain
Professional sports leagues in Spain
Sports leagues established in 1928
Spain